Fitilieu is a former commune in the Isère department in southeastern France. On 1 January 2016, it was merged into the new commune of Les Abrets-en-Dauphiné.

Geography
The Bourbre forms most of the commune's western border.

Population

See also
Communes of the Isère department

References

Former communes of Isère
Isère communes articles needing translation from French Wikipedia